The Yue Loong Feeling 101/102 is a compact car built in Taiwan by the Yue Loong Motor Company from 1986 until 1995. It is available in both five-door notchback and five-door fastback body styles.

History
First presented on 25 October 1986, it was heavily based on the T11 Auster/Stanza, built by Yulon's affiliate Nissan. Despite Yulon having invested heavily in a new R&D center (Sanyi) and having spent five years in development, hiring 300 technicians and spending NT $2 billion in the process, the car failed in the marketplace due to much publicized quality concerns. The Feeling was also marketed abroad (even in Europe), unusual for Taiwanese built cars. After a disappointing 9,451 built in the first full year, production dropped to a mere 3,846 the second year (1988). The Feeling was even displayed at the 1987 Tokyo Motor Show.

The Feeling was recognizable by its unusual three-piece, wrap around rear window. A 1.6 or a 1.8-litre four cylinder Nissan CA gasoline engine was available, with 88 or 97 hp (65, 71 kW). The 1.6 was added during 1987, complementing the pricier 1.8. Top speeds were  respectively. The bigger engine's bore was 0.3 mm less than its 1809 cc Nissan counterpart, so as to squeeze beneath Taiwan's 1.8-litre tax threshold. The facelifted Feeling 102 was released in June 1989, when claimed top speeds increased to 180 and 185 km/h for the 1.6 and 1.8 (190 km/h in the notchback 1.8).

The Feeling was imported to the Netherlands by the Abemy Group in Sassenheim during 1992. Brought over in three models (1.6 LS, 1.8 LSX, 1.8 GTX) it failed to make a splash in the marketplace. Only 122 were sold in 1992, with a total of 130 brought in. All examples were then bought back by the importer who was unable to supply spare parts for the cars. Later it was discovered that one car is still in the Netherlands, in a private collection. Yue Loong's attempt at breaking into the European market was over.

Yulon Arex

The 102 was replaced by the Yulon 601 Arex 1.8i in summer 1993, by which time the company had switched the romanized version of their name to become "Yulon". After no more than 4,300 were made, Yulon halted their attempts at making a Taiwanese national car in 1995. In total 27,876 of the three generations of Feelings/Arex' were built over a ten-year period; more than half of them were built in the first two years.

Production

References

Cars of Taiwan
First car made by manufacturer
Cars introduced in 1986
Sedans
Hatchbacks
Front-wheel-drive vehicles
Compact cars
1990s cars
Cars discontinued in 1995